Éder Díez Sánchez (born 15 July 1987) is a Spanish professional footballer who plays for CD Ebro as a forward.

He never played any higher than the Segunda División B in his own country, recording figures of 174 matches and 30 goals for eight clubs. He also spent several years in Portugal, where he made 61 professional appearances and scored eight goals in LigaPro for Chaves, Covilhã and Varzim.

Club career

Early years
Born in Barakaldo in the Basque Country, Díez came through the youth ranks of Athletic Bilbao. He made his senior debut with farm team CD Basconia of the Tercera División, then rose to the reserves in Segunda División B. He spent the following seasons also in the third division, with Sestao River Club (relegated), Celta de Vigo B and SD Lemona (on loan). 

In July 2011, Díez dropped down a division to play for CD Ourense.

Portugal
Díez moved abroad in 2012, joining G.D. Chaves in Portugal's third tier. The team from Trás-os-Montes won the league title in his first season, and the following campaign he had his first professional experience in the Segunda Liga; for 2014–15 he was loaned back down a division to satellite club Juventude de Pedras Salgadas, before terminating his contract in December 2014.

Díez then signed for C.D. Mafra of division three, now renamed the Campeonato de Portugal, and again won the league title in 2015. After a spell with F.C. Pedras Rubras, he returned to the second division in January 2016 when he moved to S.C. Covilhã until the end of the season with the option of another year. 

On 31 August 2016, Díez rescinded his contract after five games of the season and moved across the league to Varzim SC. In July 2017, having become a free agent, he signed for AD Fafe of the third tier.

Return home
On 31 January 2018, Díez ended his spell abroad when he signed for Pontevedra CF in Spain's third division. In July that year, he transferred to CD Badajoz. He had his most prolific year representing the Extremadurans, scoring ten goals and reaching the play-offs for the first time in his career (quarter-final defeat to UD Logroñés). 

In July 2019, Díez agreed to a one-year deal at Lleida Esportiu with the option for a second. Fourteen months later, he was added to UD Melilla for one season.

Having scored only once during his year in the North African exclave, Díez signed with CD Ebro of the new fourth tier, the Segunda División RFEF, on 18 July 2021.

References

External links

1987 births
Living people
Spanish footballers
Footballers from Barakaldo
Association football forwards
Segunda División B players
Tercera División players
Segunda Federación players
CD Basconia footballers
Bilbao Athletic footballers
Athletic Bilbao footballers
Sestao River footballers
Celta de Vigo B players
SD Lemona footballers
CD Ourense footballers
Pontevedra CF footballers
CD Badajoz players
Lleida Esportiu footballers
UD Melilla footballers
CD Ebro players
Liga Portugal 2 players
Segunda Divisão players
G.D. Chaves players
Juventude de Pedras Salgadas players
C.D. Mafra players
F.C. Pedras Rubras players
S.C. Covilhã players
Varzim S.C. players
AD Fafe players
Spanish expatriate footballers
Expatriate footballers in Portugal
Spanish expatriate sportspeople in Portugal